Atlanticetus is a genus of extinct baleen whales known from the Early Miocene of Italy and the US Eastern Seaboard.

Species 
The type species, Atlanticetus patulus was originally described as Aglaocetus patulus from the Calvert Formation by Remington Kellogg in 1968. However, it was recovered by Bisconti et al. (2013) in a different phylogenetic position than the Aglaocetus type species Aglaocetus moreni. In 2020, A. patulus was made the type species of a new genus Atlanticetus. A second species, A. lavei, is known from the early Miocene Gruppo Pietra da Cantoni of Piedmont, Italy.

References 

Prehistoric cetacean genera
Miocene cetaceans
Miocene mammals of Europe
Fossils of Italy
Miocene mammals of North America
Neogene United States
Fossil taxa described in 2020